Anna Reymer (born 18 November 1985) is a New Zealand rower.

She was born in Tokoroa. She competed in double sculls together with Fiona Paterson at the 2012 Summer Olympics in London, where they placed fifth.

References

1985 births
Living people
Sportspeople from Tokoroa
New Zealand female rowers
Olympic rowers of New Zealand
Rowers at the 2012 Summer Olympics
World Rowing Championships medalists for New Zealand
21st-century New Zealand women